Park Kun-woo (Hangul: 박건우; born September 8, 1990) is a South Korean professional baseball outfielder for the NC Dinos of the KBO League. He joined the Doosan Bears through the second draft in 2009 after graduating from Seoul High School. On September 2, 2009, he made his first hit and scored his first run in his debut game. After the 2010 season, he temporarily left the Doosan Bears to serve a two-year mandatory military commitment. He played for the Korean Police Baseball Team during the military duty in 2011 and 2012. He played for the South Korea national baseball team at the 2017 World Baseball Classic.

In 2017, he joined the 20–20 club as the first player in the Bears history.

References

External links 
Career statistics and player information from the KBO League
Park Kun-woo at Doosan Bears Baseball Club

1990 births
Living people
Doosan Bears players
NC Dinos players
South Korean baseball players
KBO League outfielders
2017 World Baseball Classic players
Baseball players at the 2020 Summer Olympics
Olympic baseball players of South Korea
2023 World Baseball Classic players